2004–05 Belarusian Cup was the 14th edition of the football knock-out competition in Belarus.

First round
All 13 teams from the Second League, 15 teams from the First League (out of 16, excluding Dinamo Minsk youth reserve team Dinamo-Juni Minsk) and 2 amateur clubs started in this round. The games were played on 14 July 2004.

Round of 32
15 winners of previous round were joined by 16 clubs from Premier League. Slavia Mozyr from Premier League advanced to the Round of 16 by drawing of lots. The games were played on 14 and 15 August 2004. Match involving Dinamo Minsk was rescheduled to 25 September 2004.

Round of 16
The games were played on 12 October, 11 and 14 November 2004.

Quarterfinals
The first legs were played on 3 April 2005. The second legs were played on 7 April 2005.

|}

First leg

Second leg

Semifinals
The first legs were played on 12 April 2005. The second legs were played on 4 May 2005.

|}

First leg

Second leg

Final

External links
RSSSF

Belarusian Cup seasons
Belarusian Cup
Cup
Cup